Alexios Axouch or Axouchos, sometimes found as Axuch, was a 12th-century Byzantine nobleman and military leader of Turkish ancestry.

Biography
Alexios Axouch was the son of John Axouch, the megas domestikos of the Byzantine army, boyhood friend and "right-hand man" of Emperor John II Komnenos (r. 1118–43). Alexios himself married Maria Komnene, the daughter of John II's eldest son and co-emperor Alexios, who died in 1142. 

An experienced soldier, Alexios was awarded the rank of protostrator and participated in several military campaigns during the middle reign of Emperor Manuel I Komnenos (r. 1143–80). He was sent to Southern Italy in 1157, in an effort to retrieve the Byzantine position there following the defeat of megas doux Alexios Komnenos. Despite having at the same time to manage the delicate relations, fraught with mutual suspicion, with the Holy Roman Empire, which dominated northern Italy, Axouch was apparently very successful in his mission, leading to the conclusion of an honourable peace with King William I of Sicily in 1158 that allowed the Byzantine army to extricate itself from the Italian adventure. This allowed Manuel to focus his attention in the East, where his policies in Cilicia against the Armenian lord Thoros had failed spectacularly. In 1165, Alexios himself was sent to Cilicia as commander-in-chief (strategos autokrator) and governor (doux) during the captivity of Constantine Kalamanos. He possibly also participated in the war with Hungary in 1166 alongside the future Béla III of Hungary.

In circa 1167/70, however, he fell out of favour with Manuel after being charged with conspiring against him and having previously been criticized for a peculiar act of lèse majesté: he had decorated one of his palaces in Constantinople with magnificent pictures of the campaigns and victories of Kilij Arslan II (r. 1156–92), the Seljuk Sultan of Iconium, and not, as was customary, with the exploits of Manuel himself. Among other things, Alexios was accused of "dabbling in sorcery" and conspiring with a Latin "wizard" to drug the Empress Maria of Antioch to prevent her from giving birth to an heir. The historian John Kinnamos maintained that the charges of conspiracy were genuine, but Niketas Choniates believed that Axouch had been set up by the insecure Manuel. In particular, Choniates reports that Manuel suspected both Axouch and his cousin, the future Andronikos I Komnenos (r. 1182–85), because of the AIMA prophecy, that stated that his successor's name would begin with an "A". Whatever the truth, Alexios was found guilty and confined to a monastery for the rest of his days, despite his wife's repeated efforts to secure his release by Manuel. Maria reportedly died from her sorrow over her husband's fate, while Alexios himself also dying a few years after his tonsure.

Alexios Axouch had two sons, one of whom, John Komnenos "the Fat", led an abortive revolt against Emperor Alexios III Angelos (r. 1195–1203) in July 1201, and was killed during it.

References

Sources
 

12th-century Byzantine people
Byzantine generals
Komnenos dynasty
Seljuk dynasty
Alexios
Protostratores
Generals of Manuel I Komnenos